Luoyang Beijiao Airport  is an airport serving the city of Luoyang in Henan Province, China. In 2009, Luoyang airport was the 4th busiest airport in China in terms of traffic movement. This is mainly because the airport houses an exercising terminal of Civil Aviation Flight University of China.

Airlines and destinations

See also
List of airports in China
List of the busiest airports in China
Civil Aviation Flight University of China

References

Airports in Henan
Buildings and structures in Luoyang
Transport in Luoyang